Pilot Point High School is a public high school located in the city of Pilot Point, Texas and classified as a 3A school by the UIL.  It is a part of the Pilot Point Independent School District located in northeast Denton County.   In 2013, the school was rated "Met Standard" by the Texas Education Agency.

Athletics
The Pilot Point Bearcats compete in these sports 

Volleyball, Cross Country, Football, Basketball, Powerlifting, Golf, Tennis, Track, Baseball & Softball

State Titles
Football 
1980(2A)^ 1981(2A), 2009(2A)
Softball 
2013(2A)
^ co-champions

Notable alumni
G.A. Moore - Class of 1957 - Texas High School Football's most winning coach with a record of 422-86-9.  He not only graduated from Pilot Point but coached the Bearcats in 3 different stints (1963-1970, 1977-1985, and 2002-2004)
Colt Knost - Class of 2003 - PGA Golfer, won the Texas Class 3A State Championship his Sr. Year of H.S. and played at Southern Methodist University where he was All Conference and won Western Athletic Conference Freshman of the Year in 2004.  In 2007 he won the U.S. Amateur Public Links championship and was the inaugural winner of the *Mark H. McCormack Medal by The Royal and Ancient Golf Club at St. Andrew's for the amateur player.
Joe Exotic - Class of 1982 - Former owner of the Greater Wynnewood Exotic Animal Park and star of the popular Netflix documentary Tiger King.
Sterling Jones - Actor Lone Survivor and Greys Anatomy

References

External links
Pilot Point ISD website

Public high schools in Texas
High schools in Denton County, Texas